The Dravidian movement in British India started with the formation of the Justice Party on 20 November 1916 in  Victoria Public Hall in Madras by C. Natesa Mudaliar along with T. M. Nair and P. Theagaraya Chetty as a result of a series of non-Brahmin conferences and meetings in the presidency. Communal division between Brahmins and non-Brahmins began in the presidency during the late-19th and early-20th century, mainly due to caste prejudices and disproportionate Brahmins representation in government jobs. The Justice Party's foundation marked the culmination of several efforts to establish an organisation to represent the non-Brahmins in Madras Presidency.

Background

Brahmin/non-Brahmin divide

The Brahmins in Madras Presidency enjoyed a higher position in India's social hierarchy. By the 1850s, Telugu Brahmins and Tamil Brahmins comprising only 3.2% of the population began to increase their political power by filling most of the jobs which were open to Indian men at that time. They dominated the administrative services and the newly created urban professions in the 19th and early 20th century. The higher literacy and English language proficiency among Brahmins were instrumental in this ascendancy. The political, social, and economical divide between Brahmins and non-Brahmins became more apparent in the beginning of the 20th century. This breach was further exaggerated by Annie Besant and her Home Rule for India movement. The following table shows the distribution of selected jobs among different caste groups in 1912 in Madras Presidency.

The dominance of Brahmins was also evident in the membership of the Madras Legislative Council. During 1910–20, eight out of the nine official members (appointed by the Governor of Madras) were Brahmins. Apart from the appointed members, Brahmins also formed the majority of the members elected to the council from the district boards and municipalities. During this period the Madras Province Congress Committee (regional branch of the Indian National Congress) was also dominated by Brahmins. Of the 11 major newspapers and magazines in the presidency, two (The Madras Mail and Madras Times) were run by Europeans sympathetic to the crown, three were evangelical non–political periodicals, four (The Hindu, Indian Review, Swadesamithran and Andhra Pathrika) were published by Brahmins while New India, run by Annie Besant was sympathetic to the Brahmins. This dominance was denounced by the non-Brahmin leaders in the form of pamphlets and open letters written to the Madras Governor. The earliest examples of such pamphlets are the ones authored by the pseudonymous author calling himself "fair play" in 1895. By the second decade of the 20th century, the Brahmins of the presidency were themselves divided into three factions. These were the Mylapore faction comprising Chetpet Iyers and Vembakkam Iyengars, the Egmore faction led by the editor of The Hindu, Kasturi Ranga Iyengar and the Salem nationalists led by C. Rajagopalachari. A fourth non-Brahmin faction rose to compete with them and became the Justice party.

References

Works cited

 
Anti-caste movements
Political history of the Madras Presidency